Night of the Burglar is a 1921 German silent drama film directed by Uwe Jens Krafft and starring Paul Richter, Aud Egede-Nissen, and Rudolf Lettinger.

It was shot at the Emelka Studios in Munich.

Cast

References

Bibliography

External links

1921 films
Films of the Weimar Republic
German silent feature films
Films directed by Uwe Jens Krafft
German black-and-white films
Films shot at Bavaria Studios
Bavaria Film films
1920s German films